Shiraza Dogri (Dogri: शीराज़ा डोगरी or شیرازه ڈوگری) is a bimonthly Dogri-language literary magazine from Jammu and Kashmir that is published by the Jammu and Kashmir Academy of Art, Culture and Languages. Its publication began in 1964 as a biannual periodical, but the frequency increased to quarterly in 1970 and bimonthly in 1979.

It is published in language Urdu also.

See also
Dogri

References

1964 establishments in Jammu and Kashmir
Biannual magazines published in India
Bi-monthly magazines published in India
Dogri-language magazines
Literary magazines published in India
Magazines established in 1964
Quarterly magazines published in India